Danilo Stefani (born 19 January 1979) is an Italian footballer who played as a midfielder.  After playing two matches with A.C. Fiorentina in Serie A he continued his career with various teams in Serie C2 and from 2007 played in Serie D, Eccellenza and Promozione, the divisions of amateur (and semi-pro) Lega Nazionale Dilettanti of Italy.

Honours
Fiorentina
Supercoppa Italiana: 1996

References

External links
 

1979 births
Living people
Italian footballers
ACF Fiorentina players
Casale F.B.C. players
U.S. Poggibonsi players
Alma Juventus Fano 1906 players
Serie A players
Serie C players
Association football midfielders